is a Japanese athlete who competes in archery, who is a former world number one.

He won a bronze medal in archery at the 1984 Summer Olympics.

Yamamoto competed at the 2004 Summer Olympics in men's individual archery.  He won his first three elimination matches, advancing to the quarterfinals.  In the quarterfinals, Yamamoto faced Im Dong-hyun of South Korea, defeating the 1st-ranked archer 111–110 in the 12-arrow match and advancing to the semifinals.  There, he faced Tim Cuddihy of Australia, defeating the eventual bronze medalist in a 10–9 tie-breaker after the first 12 arrows resulted in a 115–115 tie.  Yamamoto then competed against Marco Galiazzo of Italy in the gold medal match, losing 111–109 to finish with the silver medal.

Since 2004 Yamamoto has been a frequent guest on television programs in Japan and has become a well recognized public figure.

Yamamoto was also a member of the 8th-place Japanese men's archery team at the 2004 Summer Olympics.

References

1962 births
Living people
Japanese male archers
Olympic archers of Japan
Olympic bronze medalists for Japan
Olympic silver medalists for Japan
Archers at the 1984 Summer Olympics
Archers at the 1988 Summer Olympics
Archers at the 1992 Summer Olympics
Archers at the 1996 Summer Olympics
Archers at the 2004 Summer Olympics
Sportspeople from Yokohama
Nippon Sport Science University alumni
Olympic medalists in archery
Asian Games medalists in archery
Medalists at the 2004 Summer Olympics
Archers at the 1982 Asian Games
Archers at the 1986 Asian Games
Archers at the 1990 Asian Games
Archers at the 1994 Asian Games
Archers at the 1998 Asian Games
Archers at the 2002 Asian Games
Asian Games gold medalists for Japan
Asian Games silver medalists for Japan
Asian Games bronze medalists for Japan
Medalists at the 1984 Summer Olympics
Medalists at the 1982 Asian Games
Medalists at the 1986 Asian Games
Medalists at the 1990 Asian Games
Medalists at the 1994 Asian Games
Medalists at the 2002 Asian Games
20th-century Japanese people